Chernyayevka is a rural locality (a selo) and the administrative centre of Chernyayevsky Selsoviet, Kizlyarsky District, Republic of Dagestan, Russia. The population was 2,279 as of 2010. There are 23 streets.

Geography 
Chernyayevka is located 32 km northeast of Kizlyar (the district's administrative centre) by road. Sangishi, Sar-Sar and Novaya Serebryakovka are the nearest rural localities.

Nationalities 
Lezgins, Russians, Avars, Dargins, Tabasarans, Aghuls, Laks, Azerbaijanis and Chechens live there.

References 

Rural localities in Kizlyarsky District